The Governor of Inverness or Governor of Fort George and Fort Augustus was a British Army officer who commanded the garrisons at Fort George and Fort Augustus in Inverness-shire. The office became a sinecure and was abolished in 1833.

Governors of Fort George and Fort Augustus
 1725: Jasper Clayton
 1733: George Wade (also Governor of Fort William)
 1748: Henry Hawley
 1752: Sir Charles Howard
 1765: Studholme Hodgson
 1798: Sir Ralph Abercromby
 1801: Sir David Dundas
 1804: William Dalrymple
 1804: Alexander Ross
 1827: Sir David Baird
 1829: Sir George Murray

Deputy Governors of Fort George
 James Cunningham
 1736: William Kennedy
 1743: George Grant
 c.1747: William Caulfield
 1767: Charles Beauclerk
 1774: Alexander Campbell
 1779: John Campbell
 1790: Sir Robert Sinclair
 1795: The Hon. James Stewart
 1808: James Robertson
 1811: Alexander Mair

Deputy Governors of Fort Augustus
 1753: Alexander Trapaud
 1796: George Brodie
 1812: Archibald Campbell

References

Inverness
History of the Scottish Highlands